The Set-Up is a 1926 American silent Western film directed by Clifford Smith and starring Art Acord, Alta Allen and Albert Schaefer.

Cast
 Art Acord as Deputy Art Stratton 
 Alta Allen as Thora Barton 
 Albert Schaefer as Tub Jones 
 Thomas G. Lingham as Seth Tolliver 
 C. Montague Shaw as Cliff Barton 
 Jack Quinn as Bert Tolliver 
 William Welsh as Sheriff Hayes

References

Bibliography
 Munden, Kenneth White. The American Film Institute Catalog of Motion Pictures Produced in the United States, Part 1. University of California Press, 1997.

External links
 

1926 films
1926 Western (genre) films
Universal Pictures films
Films directed by Clifford Smith
American black-and-white films
Silent American Western (genre) films
1920s English-language films
1920s American films